is a neighborhood in Minato, Tokyo, Japan.

Economy 
Sony operates the Takanawa Office in Takanawa.

Education 

Minato City Board of Education operates public elementary and junior high schools.

Takanawa 1-chōme 1-3-ban are zoned to Shirogane-no-oka Gakuen (白金の丘学園) for elementary and junior high school. Takanawa 1-chōme 4-5-ban are zoned to Mita Elementary School (御田小学校) and Mita Junior High School (田中学校). 

Takanawadai Elementary School occupies a historic building that had been renovated. Takamatsu Junior High is a junior high school. Takamatsunomiya contributed some of its own mansions for Minato and a junior high school was built there.

The Takanawa Public Library occupies the 3rd and 4th floors on the Takanawa Branch office, Minato City. It periodically holds film shows for adult users as well as children's programs involving toddlers to elementary pupils. There are gallery walls where the local public elementary school holds art shows.

Takanawa Branch, Minato City Office 
The Minato City Office has a district general branch, "Takanawa Sogo shisho" at 16-25, Takanawa 1-chome, and provides services and duties for the citizens and visitors in the area of 4 and 5-chome Mita, Takanawa, Shirokane and Shirokanedai.(and )

Notable sites 
Charity
UNICEF House

Embassies
Embassy of the Federal Democratic Republic of Ethiopia, Tokyo, Japan
The Embassy of Iceland
Embassy of the Republic of Iraq in Tokyo
Embassy of the Republic of Malawi in Japan
The Embassy of the Democratic Socialist Republic of Sri Lanka

Facilities for fine arts and entertainment
Ajinomoto Corporate Museum—lifestyles of different periods shown with replica
Maxell Aqua Park Shinagawa 
The Hatakeyama Memorial Museum of Fine Art—collection of Chinese, Korean and Japanese art
 Museum of Logistics
NHK Symphony Orchestra
Prinzchien Garten
T-Joy PRINCE Shinagawa (Shinagawa Prince Cinema)

Historical sites and monuments

 Chinquapin at former Hosokawa residence (Metropolitan relic) 
Gyoranzaka—backdrop to Seishi Yokomizo's novel
Kaitōkaku—private club for Mitsubishi Group
Site of residence of Iwaya Sazanami—a designated cultural asset of Tokyo
Stone wall in Takanawa seashore—(高輪海岸の石垣石, Takanawa kaigan no ishigaki ishi) is a historical place in Takanawa. In the Edo period, stone walls were built along the Takanawa seashore, and they are now a historical site. The research excavation at the ruins in the ward facility building in 20th of 1995 Takanawa 2-chome unearthed this historical site.  The public now have had access to the historical site, which the Minato Ward school board established in 2002.
Takanawa Imperial Residence—Forty-seven Ronin were executed; access limited. (Former mansion of Nobuhito, Prince Takamatsu maintained by the Imperial Household Agency)
Takanawa Okido—designated national asset

Hotels
The Grand Prince Hotel Takanawa
The Grand Prince Hotel New Takanawa
Shinagawa Prince Hotel

Police stations and fire stations
Takanawa fire station at Nihon-enoki 
Takanawa police station

Religious institutions
Koyasan Tokyo Betsuin, branch temple of Koyasan in Tokyo
Maruyama Jinja, a Shinto shrine
Monument to the opening of Shinagawa Station
Sengaku-ji—the graves of the Forty-seven rōnin and their lord as a Minato-ku designated cultural asset. A designated national asset.
Tōzen-ji—the site of the first British legation

Schools
Takamatsu Junior High School (Municipal)
Takanawadai Elementary School(Municipal)
Takanawa Junior/Senior High School
Tokai University Takanawa campus
Tokai University Takanawadai Junior and Senior High School

Shopping streets
Gyoranzaka Ginza Shotenkai
Merry Road Takanawa
Takanawadai shotenkai
Takanawa Sengakuji-mae Shotenkai

Subway, train and bus services
In Takanawa area, there are three subway stations, one each by two operating companies and the JR train station. Each of them are served with municipal and public bus services.

For bus services, the City of Minato operates community bus system called "Chii Bus", serving Takanawa area with Takanawa Route.

Tokyo Metropolitan Government runs buses nicknamed Toei Bus, or To-Bus in short, and services are available in Takanawa neighborhood, too.

Tokyu Bus operates lines in Takanawa area as well. Takanawa has bus access from Shinagawa station east gate to Tokyo International Airport in Narita, Chiba prefecture as well as from Grand Prince Hotel New Takanawa to Haneda Airport.

Sengakuji 
Subway Toei Asakusa Line and Keikyū Main Line serve Sengakuji station.

Bus routes in Sengakuji area 
Shina 97: Shinjuku station west gate
Tan 96: Gotanda station - Sengakuji - Roppongi Hills

Shinagawa 
JR East serves Shinagawa with Tokaido Shinkansen, Yamanote Line, Keihin-Tōhoku Line, Tōkaidō Main Line and Yokosuka Line, along with Keikyū Main Line by Keikyū.

Bus routes in Shinagawa area 
Shinagawa station Takanawa gate
Shina 93: Shinagawa - Meguro (Toei Bus)
Shina 94: Shinagawa - Kamata station (Tokyu Bus)
Shina 97: Shinagawa - Shinjuku station west gate (Toei Bus)
Tan 96: Shinagawa - Gotanda - Roppongi Hills (Toei Bus)
Shinagawa station east gate - Narita Airport

Shirokane-Takanawa 
Two subway systems, or Tokyo Metro Namboku Line and Toei Mita Line serve Shirokane-Takanawa Station.

Bus routes in Shirokane-Takanawa area 
Routes connecting transportation hubs are:
Shirokane Takanawa station
Ta 87: Shibuya station - Shirokane-Takanawa - Tamachi station
Tan 94: Gotanda station via Takanawadai station
Gyoranzaka-shita crossing
Shina 97: Shinjuku station west gate
Ta 87: Tamachi - Shirokane-Takanawa - Shibuya
Tan 94: Akabanebashi - Shirokane-Takanawa - Gotanda via Takanawadai station
Tan 96: Gotanda - Shirokane-Takanawa - Roppongi Hills
Tan 97: Shinagawa station Takanawa gate - Shirokane-Takanawa

Takanawadai 
Subway Toei Asakusa Line serves Takanawadai Station.

Bus routes in Takanawadai area 
The Grand Prince Hotel New Takanawa
Airport Limousine (Haneda): Grand Prince Hotel New Takanawa - Terminal 2, Haneda - Terminal 1, Haneda - International Terminal, Haneda
Shina 93: Ōi Keibajō - The Grand Prince Hotel New takanawa - Meguro
Shina 97: Shinjuku station west gate - The Grand Prince Hotel New takanawa - Shinagawa station Takanawa gate
The Grand Prince Hotel Takanawa
Airport Limousine (Haneda): Grand Prince Hotel Takanawa  - Grand Prince Hotel New Takanawa - Terminal 2, Haneda  - Terminal 1, Haneda - International Terminal, Haneda
Airport Limousine (Narita): Grand Prince Hotel New Takanawa - Shinagawa station east gate - Terminal 2, Narita Airport - Terminal 1, Narita Airport - Terminal 3, Narita Airport
Shirokanedai 2-chome
Tan 94: Akabanebashi - Shirokanedai 2-chome - Gotanda
Takanawadai
Tan 94: Akabanebashi - Takanawadai - Gotanda

References

External links

Geography of Minato, Tokyo